Lacinutrix undariae is a Gram-negative, aerobic and non-motile bacterium from the genus of Lacinutrix.

References 

Flavobacteria
Bacteria described in 2015